Timo Çeçen (born 17 May 1994) is a German footballer who plays as a midfielder for TSV Eintracht Stadtallendorf.

Club career 
Çeçen was born in Wehrda. He made his debut for VfB Stuttgart II in the Mercedes-Benz Arena on 4 August 2012 in the 3. Liga in a 2–0 victory against Karlsruher SC.

On 28 January 2015, Çeçen moved to Chemnitzer FC.

International career 
On 21 May 2009, Çeçen made his first appearance for the national under-15 team of Germany against the USA. He played for the German national under-17 team in the 2011 UEFA European Under-17 Championship qualifying round Group 2 on 17 October 2010 against Bosnia and Herzegovina and on 20 October 2010 against Austria. In the 2013 UEFA European Under-19 Football Championship qualification Group 5 Çeçen appeared in the matches on 11 October 2012 against Macedonia and on 16 October 2012 against Ireland.

Personal life 
Çeçen was born to a Turkish father of Chechen descent and a Spanish and Italian mother.

References

External links 
 
 

1994 births
Footballers from Hesse
Sportspeople from Marburg
Living people
German footballers
Germany youth international footballers
Association football midfielders
VfB Stuttgart II players
Chemnitzer FC players
FC 08 Homburg players
FC Gießen players
TSV Eintracht Stadtallendorf players
3. Liga players
Regionalliga players
Oberliga (football) players